Pleckstrin homology domain-containing family M member 2 is a protein that in humans is encoded by the PLEKHM2 gene.

Model organisms				

Model organisms have been used in the study of PLEKHM2 function. A conditional knockout mouse line, called Plekhm2tm1a(EUCOMM)Wtsi was generated as part of the International Knockout Mouse Consortium program—a high-throughput mutagenesis project to generate and distribute animal models of disease to interested scientists.

Male and female animals underwent a standardized phenotypic screen to determine the effects of deletion. Twenty six tests were carried out on mutant mice and three significant abnormalities were observed. Male homozygous mutants had increased circulating alkaline phosphatase levels and an increased susceptibility to bacterial infection, while females had an increased leukocyte cell number.

References

Further reading 
 
 
 
 

Genes mutated in mice